The 1992 Arab Junior Athletics Championships was the fifth edition of the international athletics competition for under-20 athletes from Arab countries. It took place in Latakia, Syria – the third consecutive time that the event was staged in the country. Morocco and Egypt, two of the region's most prominent nations in the sport, did not send a team to the competition, which reduced the standard of the performances. A total of 40 athletics events were contested, 23 for men and 17 for women.

The women's 10,000 metres was dropped from the programme on this occasion. Track events were timed only to the tenth of a second, rather than the international standard hundredth of a second. Algeria topped the medal table with fifteen gold medals, mostly in the women's section. Qatar was runner-up with twelve gold medals and was dominant in the men's track events. The most prominent athletes to medal at the competition were men's race walk runner-up Hatem Ghoula, who went on to dominate the African race walk scene and win a World Championships medal, and double middle-distance medallist Ali Hakimi, who was an Olympic finalist in 1996.

Medal summary

Men

Women

Medal table

References

Arab Junior Athletics Championships
International athletics competitions hosted by Syria
Sport in Latakia
Arab Junior Athletics Championships
Arab Junior Athletics Championships
1992 in youth sport